Shaw's dark ground snake (Erythrolamprus melanotus), also known commonly as Shaw's black-backed snake, and in Spanish as candelilla, guarda caminos, and reinita cazadora, is a species of snake in the family Colubridae. The species is native to northern South America.

Etymology
The English common names for E. melanotus refer to English biologist George Kearsley Shaw, who described and named this snake as a species new to science in 1802.

Description

Dorsally, it has a light yellow or pinkish color, with a wide, dark vertebral stripe, which is bordered on each side by a thin whitish stripe, followed by a thin dark stripe. The top of the head is olive, and there is a dark stripe passing through the eye. The upper labials and the venter (underside) of the snake are whitish.

The dorsal scales are smooth, with apical pits, and are arranged in 17 rows at midbody.

Behavior and diet
E. melanotus actively forages during the day for food, which may include fish, amphibians, and lizards.

Reproduction
E. melanotus is oviparous.

Geographic range
The geographic distribution of E. melanotus includes Colombia, Venezuela, and Trinidad and Tobago.  It is probably extirpated from Grenada.

Habitat

References

Further reading
Dixon JR, Michaud EJ (1992). "Shaw's black-backed snake (Liophis melanotus) (Serpentes: Colubridae) of Northern South America". Journal of Herpetology 26 (3): 250–259. (Liophis melanotus lamari and Liophis melanotus nesos, new subspecies).
Grazziotin FG, Zaher H, Murphy RW, Scrocchi G, Benavides MA, Zhang Y-P, Bonatto SL (2012). "Molecular phylogeny of the New World Dipsadidae (Serpentes: Colubroidea): a reappraisal". Cladistics 28 (5): 437–459. (Erythrolamprus melanotus, new combination, p. 457).
Schwartz A, Thomas R (1975). A Check-List of West Indian Amphibians and Reptiles. Carnegie Museum of Natural History Special Publication No. 1. Pittsburgh, Pennsylvania: Carnegie Museum of Natural History. 216 pp. (Dromicus melanotus, p. 182).
Shaw G (1802). General Zoology, or Systematic Natural History, Vol. III., Part II. London: G. Kearsley. vii + pp. 313–615. (Coluber melanotus, new species, p. 534).

Erythrolamprus
Snakes of the Caribbean
Snakes of South America
Reptiles of Colombia
Reptiles of Venezuela
Reptiles of Trinidad and Tobago
Reptiles described in 1802